Route 53 is a  south–north state highway in southeastern Massachusetts. Its southern terminus is at Route 3A in Kingston and its northern terminus is at Route 3A in Quincy. Along the way it intersects Route 3 in Hanover.

History
Route 53 follows the former routing of the Kingston to Quincy section of Route 3 which was moved onto the Southeast Expressway and Pilgrim's Highway expressway when they were fully completed in 1963. The remaining former sections of Route 3 became extensions of Route 3A.

For a period of time, from at least the early 1930s through 1967, a mile of what is now Route 53, between Derby Street and Main Street (Route 228), was also coextensive with Route 128.  In 1967 that route was cut back to the Braintree Split, and again in 1997 it was officially cut back to the I-95/I-93 junction in Canton.

Queen Anne's Corner
The intersection of Route 53 with Route 228 on the Hingham–Norwell town line is known as Queen Anne's Corner or historically Queen Ann's Corner and the nearby section of Route 53 has also been known as Queen Anne's (or Ann's) Turnpike. The name comes from Anne Whiton, a local tavern owner who in the mid-1700s, along with her daughters, had an "unsavory reputation" and was called quean with the archaic meaning of the word as prostitute.

Route description

Route 53 begins in Kingston at Route 3A, just a third of a mile west of where that route meets Route 3 at Exit 10.  It heads north, almost immediately entering the town of Duxbury.  It passes through the southwestern part of that town before meeting Route 14 just over the line into Pembroke.  The two routes pass concurrently for over a mile and a half before splitting in the area of North Pembroke.  Route 53 is alone for just over a mile and a quarter before becoming concurrent with Route 139.  The two routes pass over the North River into Hanover together before splitting.  

Route 53 heads northwards through the eastern part of Hanover until it passes the Hanover Mall and meets Route 3 once more, at Exit 13. From Route 3 it bends northwestward, going through the western portion of Norwell before meeting Route 228 just over the town line into Hingham.  The route passes through the southwest corner of that town before entering Weymouth.  In Weymouth, the route bisects the town from southeast to northwest, passing Whitman's Pond and the northern end of Route 18.  Route 53 then enters Braintree, crossing the Monatiquot River before entering Quincy, passing the site of the Fore River Shipyard.  After just a mile, Route 53 ends at Route 3A, with that route resuming the former route of Route 3.

Major intersections

References

053
Streets in Braintree, Massachusetts
Duxbury, Massachusetts
Kingston, Massachusetts
Pembroke, Massachusetts
Hanover, Massachusetts
Norwell, Massachusetts
Hingham, Massachusetts
Weymouth, Massachusetts
Quincy, Massachusetts
Transportation in Norfolk County, Massachusetts
Transportation in Plymouth County, Massachusetts